AH6 may refer to:

Boeing AH-6, an American helicopter gunship
AH6 (highway), a highway in the Asian Highway Network.  The highway spans across South Korea, North Korea, Russia, China, and Kazakhstan.